Cylicasta nysa is a species of beetle in the family Cerambycidae. It was described by Dillon and Dillon in 1946. It is known from Costa Rica, Colombia, and Nicaragua.

References

Onciderini
Beetles described in 1946